Marie Antoinette (1755–1793) was an Archduchess of Austria and the Queen of France and Navarre.

Marie Antoinette may also refer to:
Marie Antoinette (TV series), a drama series for Canal+, BBC and PBS
Marie Antoinette, the Love of a King, a 1922 German film directed by Rudolf Meinert
Marie Antoinette: The Portrait of an Average Woman, a 1932 biography by Stefan Zweig
Marie Antoinette (1938 film), a film starring Norma Shearer based on the Zweig book
Marie Antoinette: The Journey, a 2001 biography by Antonia Fraser
Marie Antoinette (2006 film), a film by Sofia Coppola based on the Fraser book
Marie Antoinette (soundtrack)
Marie Antoinette (musical), a 2006 musical theater production by Michael Kunze and Sylvester Levay
Marie Antoinette with a Rose, an oil painting by Élisabeth Vigée Le Brun
Marie Antoinette, a play by Paolo Giacometti
“Marie Antoinette”, a song by Curved Air from the album Phantasmagoria
Marie Antoinette (Lady Oscar), a character in The Rose of Versailles series
Marie Antoinette (watch), a watch designed by Swiss watchmaker Abraham-Louis Breguet in 1802
Marie Antoinette (name)

See also

Maria Antonia (disambiguation)
María Antonieta
María Antonietta